Abdolreza Sheykholeslami is an Iranian politician who is the former Minister of Cooperatives, Labour and Social Welfare. Before that, he was the Minister of Labour and Social Affairs in the second cabinet of Mahmoud Ahmadinejad from 2009 to 2011. He was dismissed from office on 3 February 2013, being the ninth minister to be fired during the second term of president Mahmoud Ahmedinejad since 2009.

Early life and education
Sheykholeslam was born on 1 January 1967 in Nowshahr, Mazandaran Province. He was graduated from Iran University of Science and Technology in 1993, receiving a bachelor's degree in urban engineering. In 1995, he obtained a master's degree. He also holds a PhD in urban engineering, which he received from Iran University of Science and Technology in 2006.

Career
Sheykholeslam was a university teacher until 1997. He was appointed as deputy governor of Hormozgan Province in 1997 after Ali Nazari became governor. In March 2001, Nazari was resigned from office and Sheykholeslam was appointed by Mohammad Khatami as governor. He was in office until August 2005 after Mahmoud Ahmadinejad appointed him as the head of presidential center. On 6 August 2009, he was nominated as minister of labour and social affairs by Ahmadinejad and was confirmed by Parliament with an absolute majority. On 26 July 2011, he was nominated as minister of cooperatives, labour and social welfare after three ministries were merged and was confirmed by the Parliament on 3 August 2011. He was resigned on 3 February 2013 after parliament given a vote of no confidence to him. 192 of 272 parliament members voted in favour of the impeachment of Sheykholeslam in the parliament. Asadollah Abbasi replaced him as acting minister.

References

1967 births
Living people
Iran University of Science and Technology alumni
Government ministers of Iran
Iranian engineers
Impeached Iranian officials removed from office
People from Nowshahr